Bàu Bàng (Classical Vietnamese: 保邦) is a rural district of Bình Dương province in the Southeast region of Vietnam. It was established on December 29, 2013, and has a population of over 82,000.

Bàu Bàng is the site of the first and second battle of Bàu Bàng in 1965 and 1967, respectively.

Administrative divisions
Bàu Bàng is divided into 1 town and 6 rural communes:
Lai Uyên town
Cây Trường II
Hưng Hòa
Lai Hưng
Long Nguyên
Tân Hưng
Trừ Văn Thố

References

Districts of Bình Dương province